Crangonyx dearolfi, also known as the Pennsylvania cave amphipod or Pennsylvania cave crangonyctid, is a species of crustacean in the family Crangonyctidae. It is native to the United States, where it is found in caves in Pennsylvania and Maryland.

References

Gammaridea
Freshwater crustaceans of North America
Crustaceans of the United States
Endemic fauna of the United States
Crustaceans described in 1942
Taxonomy articles created by Polbot
Cave crustaceans